Brice Pauset (born 17 June 1965 in Besançon) is a French composer living in Germany.

Biography
Composer Brice Pauset was born in Besançon in 1965, and started his musical education by learning the piano, violin and harpsichord before turning to composition. In 1994 he was awarded a grant by the Marcel Bleustein-Blanchet Foundation and became a student at IRCAM from 1994 to 1996. He studied with Michel Philippot, Gérard Grisey and Alain Bancquart in Paris, and since then has pursued a dual career as a composer and performer of his own works as well as playing the early repertoire on the harpsichord and pianoforte and, occasionally, the modern piano.

In France, Brice Pauset regularly works with Ircam, the Festival d'Automne in Paris and the Accroche-Note ensemble, the Ars Musica festival in Belgium, Klangforum-Wien in Austria, and, in Germany, the SWR (Baden-Baden) and WDR (Köln) radios, the Musik-Biennale Berlin and the Recherche ensemble in Freiburg im Breisgau. On occasion his works call for musicians unexpected in the realm of contemporary music, such as his Vanités which was first sung by countertenor Gérard Lesne with Il Seminario Musicale at Royaumont, Kontra-Sonate based on Schubert's Sonata op. 42 (D 845), which Andreas Staier performed in June 2001 in Hagen and Paris, and Schlag-Kantilene based on Beethoven's violin concerto, with David Grimal and the Philharmonic Orchestra of Radio-France, conducted by Peter Eötvös (2010). He also, among many other ensemble or chamber works, completed a six-symphonies cycle (2001 to 2009). Arditti String Quartet, together with WDR Choir and Orchestra, under Matthias Pintscher's baton, premiered Das Dornröschen (2012) in Köln Philharmony (Germany). He has written many works for the pianist  Nicolas Hodges, including three books of Canons for solo piano, Symphony no. 4 - "Der Geograph", for piano and orchestra, and several etudes, the first of which was part of Hodges' Studies Project.

He has taught composition at Musikhochschule Freiburg-im-Breisgau since 2010. Since 2012, he has been Chief Executive of the Ensemble Contrechamps in Geneva.

Works 
Brice Pauset's music is mostly published by Editions Lemoine, Paris, works since 2014 being published by Edition Gravis, Berlin.

Theatrical works 
 Das Mädchen aus der Fremde, musical theatre on Schiller's poems "Der Tanz" and "Das Mädchen in der Fremde" (2005) for actors, dancers, choir and large instrumental ensemble. Collaborative composition with Isabel Mundry, published by Breitkopf
 WONDERFUL DELUXE, Rêves et futilités d'une idôle (2014–15), for counter tenor, five voices and ensemble, publ. by Ed. Gravis
 STRAFEN, Opera for solo voices, 6-voice madrigal, and large orchestra, (2017-19), publ. by Ed. Gravis

Orchestral works 
 Six Canons - Musurgia combinatoria (2001) Orchestra
 Kataster (2015–) for solo ensemble and orchestra, pub. Ed. Gravis
 Kontra-konzert (2011) Pianoforte, orchestra and 3 percussionists
 Konzertkammer (2010-20) Piano and chamber orchestra
 Maos Frosch (2011) Orchestra
 Schlag-Kantilene (2010) Violin and orchestra
 Symphonie I - Les outrances nécessaires (2001) Piano and chamber orchestra
 Symphonie III - Anima mundi (2005) Orchestra
 Symphonie IV - Der Geograph (2006) Piano and orchestra (CD Aeon)
 Symphonie V - Die Tänzerin (2008) Large orchestra (CD Neos)
 Un-Ruhe (1. Heft) (2013–14) for soprano, harpsichord and three orchestra groups (20') Publ. Ed. Gravis

Ensemble music 
 arbeiten. Musik mit Hebewerk (2013–15) for ensemble (20') publ. Ed. Gravis
 Autopsie de la foi (2012) Actor and ensemble
 Canons (4) - Les Saisons (1992) Solo violin and 13 string instruments
 Canons (8) (1998) Oboe d'amore and ensemble (CD Aeon)
 Concerto I - Birwa (2002) Harpsichord and ensemble (CD Aeon)
 Concerto II - Exils (2005) Solo percussion and 2 ensembles
 Harpe de Mélodie (2008) 2 percussions and ensemble
 In nomine broken consort book (2003) 8 instruments (CD Aeon)
 Kinderszenen mit Robert Schumann (2003) Ensemble (CD Numérica)
 Purcell Verschriebungen (2007) Violin and ensemble
 Schwarzmärkte (2012) Ensemble
 Theorie der Tränen: Atem (2009) Ensemble
 Vier Variationen (2007) Ensemble (CD)
 Vita Nova (sérénades) (2006) Violin and ensemble

Chamber music 
 Adagio dialettico (2000) Saxophone, percussion and piano (CD Assai - out of print)
 Die Vorüberlaufenden (2003) for fl(picc,A-fl), B-clar, vc (10') Collaborative composition with Isabel Mundry, published by Breitkopf
 Eurydice (1998/2015) for flute and string trio (CD Stradivarius)
 Les Voix humaines (2006) Clarinet, string trio and piano (CD Aeon)
 Ljusare (1992) Violin and piano (CD Aeon)
 Pluvia (1989) Violin, cello and piano
 Quatuor à cordes I Mèden agen (2001) 2 violins, viola and cello
 Quatuor à cordes II Das unglückselige Bewusstsein (1996) 2 violins, viola and cello
 Quatuor à cordes III ...récit-écrit (2002) 2 violins, viola and cello
 subito sempre (langsamer satz) - for Klaus Huber (2014) for fl, cl, pno, vn, vla, vc (8') publ. Ed. Gravis
 Theorie der Tränen: Gesang (2007) Horn and piano
 Theorie der Tränen: Schlamm (2008) Bass clarinet, violin, cello and piano (CD Stradivarius)
 Vestige (2007) Harpsichord 4 hands
 Wahrheitsverfahren (2014-) Harpsichord and string quartet (unpublished) (CD Winter & Winter)

Solo works 
 Cadences pour le Concerto pour violon et orchestre Op.61 de Beethoven (2010) Violin (CD)
 Canons (3) (1989) Piano (CD Wergo)
 Canons (5) (2002) Piano (CD Wergo)
 Canons (7) (2010) Piano (CD Wergo)
 Canons (9) (2010) Piano (CD Wergo)
 Chaconnes (2) (1991) Viola
 De Prolatione (1996) Percussion
 Entrée (2007) Harpsichord
 Etudes (2011-) Piano (No 1, 2011, Nos 2-4 2017)
 Eurydice (1998) Flute (CD Metier)
 Kontra-sonate (2000) Piano (CD Aeon)
 Kontrapartita (2008) Violin (CD Ambroisie)
 La Nef des fous (1991) Violin
 Pièces (6) (2005) Organ (CD Aeon - excerpts)
 Préludes (6) (1999) Harpsichord (CD Aeon)
 Rasch (2006) Cello
 Theorie der Tränen: Salz (2011) Horn
 Wiegenlieder (2007) Accordion

Works with electronics 
 Exercices du silence (2008) Soprano, piano and electronics
 Perspectivae Sintagma I (canons) (1997) Piano and live electronics (CD Wergo)
 Perspectivae Sintagma II (2001) Piano, 2 voices, 2 ensembles and computer
 Symphonie VI - Erstarrte Schatten (2009) Large orchestra, 6 solo voices and live electronics

Vocal and choral music 
 A (1999) Soli, chorus, 2 ensembles and informatic
 Das Dornröschen (2012) String quartet, choir and orchestra (CD Aeon)
 De Aeternitate (1998) Soprano
 De Felicitate (1997) Soprano
 Demosthenes on the seashore (2004) Mixed chorus
 Deux Corps (Galathée à l'usine) (2005) 8 voices and 2 ensembles
 Die alte Frau (2013) Soli, chorus and orchestra
 Drei Nornen (2013) Soli, chorus and orchestra
 Eleusis (An Hölderlin) (1997) Soprano, clarinet and piano (CD)
 Furcht und zittern (2009) Voices and ensemble
 Gesangbuch (2003) Soprano and piano
 Gesangbuch II (2011) Alto, viola and piano
 In girum imus nocte et consumimur igni (1995) High tenor and instrumental ensemble
 L'Opéra de la lune (2012) Soli, chorus and orchestra
 M (1996) 2 sopranos, contralto and 2 ensembles
 Portrait (2007) 4 male voices and string quartet
 Sainte (2007) Voice and piano
 Studien über Dornröschen (2) (2008) Double chorus
 Symphonie II - La liseuse (2003) Voice and orchestra
 Theorie der Tränen: Louise (2009) Soprano and ensemble
 Un-Ruhe II (2016) for voice and harpsichord (CD Stradivarius)
 Vanités (2000) High tenor, soprano and ensemble

References

French composers
French male composers
French expatriates in Germany
1965 births
Living people
Musicians from Paris
Pupils of Gérard Grisey